James Ledbetter is an author and editor based in New York City.

Career

Journalism
In 2010, Ledbetter became editor-in-charge of Reuters.com. In 2008, he joined online magazine Slate, where he oversaw the business news web site The Big Money. Prior to joining Slate, Ledbetter was at CNNMoney.com, a financial news Web site. 
In addition to Slate and CNNmoney.com, he also is a former senior editor of Time Magazine, The Industry Standard, and former staff writer for The Village Voice. His writing also has appeared in several other US publications, including The New York Times, The Washington Post, The Nation, Mother Jones, Vibe, Newsday, and The American Prospect.

Ledbetter currently serves as the chief content officer at Sequoia Capital.

Books
Ledbetter's most recent book is "One Nation Under Gold," published in 2017 by Liveright Press. Forbes Magazine reviewer Ralph Benko called the book "wildly entertaining as well as informative." Ledbetter's previous works include "Unwarranted Influence: Dwight D. Eisenhower and the Military-Industrial Complex," published in 2011 by Yale University Press, "Dispatches for the New York Tribune: Selected Journalism of Karl Marx," published in the UK in 2007 and the U.S. in 2008 by Penguin Classics, "Starving to Death on $200 Million: The Short, Absurd Life of The Industry Standard," and "Made Possible By...: The Death of Public Broadcasting in the United States."

References

External links
James Ledbetter Archive at Slate

Living people
Year of birth missing (living people)
The Village Voice people
The Nation (U.S. magazine) people
American male journalists